Linden A. Lewis is a science fiction author, best known for their debut novel The First Sister. Lewis is queer and uses she/they pronouns.

Biography

As of 2020, Lewis lives in Madrid.

Literary career

Lewis has been writing "since I can remember" and decided to draft a novel for the first time in college. They consider Margaret Atwood, Leigh Bardugo, and R.F. Kuang to be their literary inspirations.

Lewis's debut novel The First Sister was published in 2020 by Skybound Entertainment. It received moderately positive critical response. It was nominated for a Goodreads Choice Award for Best Science Fiction novel and Best Debut Novel.

Work
The First Sister Trilogy
 The First Sister, Skybound Entertainment, 2020, 
 The Second Rebel, Skybound Entertainment, 2021, ISBN 9781982127022
 The Last Hero, Skybound Entertainment, 2022, ISBN  9781982127077

References

Living people
Non-binary writers
Queer writers
Year of birth missing (living people)